The Systematic Compilation of Federal Legislation (SR; , RS; , RS) is the official compilation of all Swiss federal laws, ordinances, international and intercantonal treaties that are in force. However, some very voluminous parts of laws, such as the customs code, are not published in their entirety, but only by way of reference; they are usually made available on the websites of the government agencies responsible.

In the SR/RS, the acts are published in a consolidated form, that is, the text is updated to reflect any amendment that enters into force through publication in the Official Compilation of Federal Legislation (AS/RO/RU). By itself, publication in the SR/RS does not confer force of law. The legally binding text is that of the individual acts published in the AS/RO/RU.

It is issued in the three official languages of Switzerland: German, French and Italian. All three language editions are equally valid. It is published by the Federal Chancellery of Switzerland in the form of weekly supplements to loose leaf binders. Since 1999, they are also made available on the Internet in PDF and HTML formats.

See also 
 Law of Switzerland
 Official Compilation of Federal Legislation
 Federal Gazette
 United States Code
 Code of Federal Regulations

References

External links 
 Classified compilation
 Systematische Rechtssammlung 
 Recueil systématique 
 Raccolta sistematica 

Law of Switzerland
Switzerland Systematic Collection of Federal Law